is a town located in Yamagata Prefecture, Japan. , the town had an estimated population of 11,153 in 3701 households, and a population density of 360 persons per km2.

Geography
Nakayama is located in the western end of the Yamagata Basin in central Yamagata Prefecture, surrounded by mountains. The Mogami River flows through the town.

Neighboring municipalities
Yamagata Prefecture
Yamagata
Tendō
Ōe
Yamanobe
Sagae

Climate
Nakayama has a Humid continental climate (Köppen climate classification Cfa) with large seasonal temperature differences, with warm to hot (and often humid) summers and cold (sometimes severely cold) winters. Precipitation is significant throughout the year, but is heaviest from August to October. The average annual temperature in Nakayama is 11.7 °C. The average annual rainfall is 1398 mm with September as the wettest month. The temperatures are highest on average in August, at around 25.6 °C, and lowest in January, at around -1.1 °C.

Demographics
Per Japanese census data, the population of Nakayama has remained relatively steady over the past 50 years.

History
The area of present-day Nakayama was part of ancient Dewa Province. After the start of the Meiji period, the area became part of Higashimurayama District, Yamagata Prefecture. The town of Nakayama was established on October 1, 1954, by the merger of the town of Nagasaki with the village of Mogami.

Economy
The economy of Nakayama is based on agriculture.

Education
Nakayama has two public elementary schools and one public middle school operated by the town government. The town does not have a high school.

Transportation

Railway
 East Japan Railway Company -  Aterazawa Line
 -

Highway
  Yamagata Expressway

References

External links
 
Official Website 

 
Towns in Yamagata Prefecture